The 369th Infantry Regiment, originally formed as the 15th New York National Guard Regiment before being re-organized as the 369th upon federalization and commonly referred to as the Harlem Hellfighters, was an infantry regiment of the New York Army National Guard during World War I and World War II. The regiment consisted mainly of African Americans, though it also included men from Puerto Rico, Cuba, Guyana, Liberia, Portugal, Canada, the West Indies, as well as American white officers. With the 370th Infantry Regiment, it was known for being one of the first African-American regiments to serve with the American Expeditionary Forces during World War I.

The regiment was named the  Black Rattlers after arriving in France by its commander COL William Hayward. The nickname Men of Bronze was given to the regiment by the French after they had witnessed the gallantry of the Americans fighting in the trenches. Legend has it that they were called the Hellfighters by the German enemy, although there is no documentation of this and the moniker may have been a creation of the American press. During World War I, the 369th spent 191 days in front line trenches, more than any other American unit. They also suffered the most losses of any American regiment, with 1,500 casualties. The regiment was also the first of the Allied forces to cross the Rhine into Germany.

Background

On 5 October 1917, Emmett Jay Scott, long-time secretary to Booker T. Washington, was appointed Special Assistant to Newton D. Baker, the Secretary of War. Scott was to serve as a confidential advisor in situations that involved the well-being of ten million African Americans and their roles in the war. While many African Americans who served in the Great War believed racial discrimination would dissipate once they returned home, that did not happen. Racism after World War I was probably at its worst until the start of World War II.

Although many African Americans were eager to fight in the war, they were often turned away from military service. When the United States realized that it did not have close to enough soldiers, it decided to pass the Selective Service Act of 1917 which required all men from the ages of 21 to 30 to register for the draft; this included African Americans. Many African Americans enlisted believing that their military service would give them the opportunity to change the way they were perceived by white Americans.

The 369th Regiment was reformed from the National Guard's 15th Regiment in New York. The 15th New York National Guard was a state militia regiment which served to help suppress the 1863 New York City draft riots and was mustered into federal service for 30 days in June, 1864, providing manning for Army posts in the New York Harbor. The 15th Regiment was reconstituted after Charles S. Whitman was elected Governor of New York. He enforced the legislation that was passed due to the efforts of the 10th Cavalry in Mexico, which had passed as a law that had not manifested until June 2 1913.

When the U.S. entered World War I, many African Americans believed that entering the armed forces would help eliminate racial discrimination throughout the United States. Many felt it was "a God-sent blessing" so they could prove they deserved respect from white Americans through service in the armed forces. Through the efforts of the Central Committee of Negro College Men and President Wilson, a special training camp to train black officers for the proposed black regiments was established.

World War I

Formation
The 369th Infantry Regiment was constituted on 2 June 1913 in the New York Army National Guard as the 15th New York Infantry Regiment. The 369th Infantry was organized on 29 June 1916 at New York City.

The infantry was called into Federal service on 25 July 1917 at Camp Whitman, New York. While at Camp Whitman, the 369th Infantry learned basic military practices.  After their training at Camp Whitman, the 369th was called into active duty in New York. While in New York, the 369th's three battalions were spread throughout New York where they guarded rail lines, construction sites, and other camps.

Then on 8 October 1917 the Regiment traveled to Camp Wadsworth in Spartanburg, South Carolina, where they received training in actual combat. Camp Wadsworth was set up similar to the French battlefields. While at Camp Wadsworth they experienced significant racism from the local communities and from other units. There was one incident in which two soldiers from the 15th Regiment, Lieutenant James Reese Europe and Noble Sissle, were refused by the owner of a hotel shop when they attempted to buy a newspaper. Several soldiers from the white 27th Division, a New York National Guard organization, came to stand with and support their fellow New York soldiers. Lieutenant Europe, however, directed them to leave before violence erupted. There were many other shops that refused to sell goods to the members of the 15th Regiment, so members of the 27th Division told the shop owners that if they did not serve black soldiers that they can close their stores and leave town. The white soldiers then stated "They're our buddies. And we won't buy from men who treat them unfairly."

The 15th Infantry Regiment NYARNG was assigned on 1 December 1917 to the 185th Infantry Brigade. It was commanded by Col. William Hayward, a member of the Union League Club of New York, which sponsored the 369th in the tradition of the 20th U.S. Colored Infantry, which the club had sponsored in the U.S. Civil War. The 15th Infantry Regiment shipped out from the New York Port of Embarkation on 27 December 1917, and joined its brigade upon arrival in France. Despite its designation and training as an infantry regiment, the unit was relegated to labor service duties in France instead of being assigned a combat mission. 

The 15th Infantry Regiment, NYARNG was reorganized and re-designated on 1 March 1918 as the 369th Infantry Regiment, but the unit continued labor service duties while it awaited a decision as to its future.

Assignment to French Army 1918

The U.S. Army decided on 8 April 1918 to assign the unit to the French Army for the duration of American participation in the war because many white American soldiers refused to perform combat duty with African-Americans. The men were issued French weapons, helmets, belts, and pouches, although they continued to wear their U.S. uniforms. While in the United States, the 369th Regiment was subjected to intense racial discrimination, and its members looked down upon. French Colonel  of the American Expeditionary Forces headquarters was persuaded to write the notorious pamphlet Secret Information Concerning Black American Troops, which "warned" French civilian authorities of the alleged inferior nature and supposed racist tendencies of African Americans.

In France, the 369th was treated as if they were no different than any other French unit. For the most part, the French did not show hatred towards them and did not racially segregate the 369th. The French accepted the all black 369th Regiment with open arms and welcomed them to their country. The French army had from the start included many colonial units with non-white personnel from among others Morocco and Senegal. Also, since they faced manpower shortages, they were less concerned with race than the Americans.

The 369th Infantry Regiment was relieved 8 May 1918 from assignment to the 185th Infantry Brigade, and went into the trenches as part of the French 16th Division. It served continuously until 3 July before returning to combat in the Second Battle of the Marne. Later, the 369th was reassigned to Gen. Lebouc's 161st Division to participate in the Allied counterattack. On one tour, they were out for over six months, which was the longest deployment of any unit in World War I. On 19 August, the regiment went off the line for rest and training of replacements.

While overseas, the Hellfighters saw enemy propaganda intended for them. It claimed Germans had done nothing wrong to blacks, and they should be fighting the USA, which had oppressed them for years. It had the opposite of the intended effect.

On 25 September 1918, the French 4th Army went on the offensive in conjunction with the American drive in the Meuse–Argonne. The 369th turned in a good account in heavy fighting, though they sustained severe losses. The unit captured the important village of Séchault. At one point the 369th advanced faster than French troops on their right and left flanks, and risked being cut off. By the time the regiment pulled back for reorganization, it had advanced  through severe German resistance.

In mid-October the regiment was moved to a quiet sector in the Vosges, and was stationed there on 11 November, the day of the Armistice. Six days later, the 369th made its last advance and on 26 November, reaching the banks of the river Rhine and becoming the first Allied unit to do so. The regiment was relieved on 12 December 1918 from assignment to the French 161st Division. It returned to the New York Port of Embarkation and was demobilized on 28 February 1919 at Camp Upton at Yaphank, New York, and returned to the New York Army National Guard.

Honors

One Medal of Honor and numerous Distinguished Service Crosses were awarded to members of the regiment.

Perhaps the most celebrated man in the 369th was Pvt. Henry Johnson, a former Albany, New York, rail station porter, who earned the nickname "Black Death" for his actions in combat in France. In May 1918 Johnson and Pvt. Needham Roberts fought off a 24-man German patrol, though both were severely wounded. Johnson instructed Roberts to warn the French units of the approaching patrol, but Roberts returned to him after the Germans opened fire on their position. They battled together until a German grenade incapacitated Roberts, at which point Johnson made it his mission to hold the line and protect his fellow soldier. After they expended their ammunition, Johnson battled with grenades, then the butt of his rifle, and finally with a bolo knife. Reports suggest Johnson killed at least four German soldiers and might have wounded 30 others while sustaining at least 21 injuries. Over 100 men from the 369th were presented with American and/or French decorations. Among those honors Johnson was the first American to receive the Croix de Guerre.

On 13 December 1918, one month after Armistice day, the French government awarded the Croix de Guerre to 170 individual members of the 369th, and a unit citation was awarded to the entire regiment. It was pinned to the unit's colors by General Lebouc.

One of the first units in the United States armed forces to have black officers in addition to all-black enlisted men, the 369th could boast of a fine combat record, a regimental Croix de Guerre, and several unit citations, along with many individual decorations for valor from the French government. Nevertheless, the poor replacement system —coupled with no respite from the line — took its toll, leaving the unit utterly exhausted by the armistice in November. The 369th Infantry Regiment was the first New York unit to return to the United States, and was the first unit to march up Fifth Avenue from the Washington Square Park Arch to their armory in Harlem. Their unit was placed on the permanent list with other veteran units.

Arthur W. Little, who had been a battalion commander for the 369th, wrote in the regimental history From Harlem to the Rhine, it was official that the outfit was 191 days under fire, never lost a foot of ground or had a man taken prisoner; on two occasions men were captured, but were recovered. Only once did it fail to take its objective and that was due largely to bungling by French artillery support.

By the end of the 369th Infantry's campaign in World War, I they were present in the Champagne – Marne, Meuse – Argonne, Champagne 1918, Alsace 1918 campaigns in which they suffered 1,500 casualties, the highest of any U.S. regiment. In addition, the unit was plagued by acute discipline problems resulting from disproportionate casualties among the unit's longest-serving members and related failures to assimilate new soldiers. The 369th also fought in distinguished battles such as Belleau Wood and Chateau-Thierry.

369th Regiment Military Band

The 369th Regiment "Hellfighters Band" was relied upon not only in battle but also for morale. So by the end of their tour, they became one of the most famous military bands throughout Europe. They followed the 369th overseas and were highly regarded and known for being able to immediately boost morale. While overseas the 369th Regiment made up less than 1% of the soldiers deployed but was responsible for over 20% of the territory of all the land assigned to the United States. During the war the 369th's regimental band (under the direction of James Reese Europe) became famous throughout Europe. It introduced the until-then unknown music called jazz to British, French and other European audiences.

At the end of the war, the 369th returned to New York City, and on 17 February 1919, paraded through the city. This day became an unofficial holiday of sorts for all of Harlem. Many black school children were dismissed from school so that they could attend the parade. With the addition of many adults there were thousands of people that lined the streets to see the 369th Regiment: the parade began on Fifth Avenue at 61st Street, proceeded uptown past ranks of white bystanders, turned west on 110th Street, and then turned onto Lenox Avenue, and marched into Harlem, where black New Yorkers packed the sidewalks to see them. The parade became a marker of African American service to the nation, a frequent point of reference for those campaigning for civil rights. There were multiple parades that took place throughout the nation, many of these parades included all black regiments, including the 370th from Illinois. Then in the 1920s and 1930s, the 369th was a regular presence on Harlem's streets, each year marching through the neighborhood from their armory to catch a train to their annual summer camp, and then back through the neighborhood on their return two weeks later.

Tap dancer and actor Bill Robinson is frequently claimed to have been  the drum major for the regimental band during the homecoming parade on Fifth Avenue upon the 369th's return from overseas. This has however been questioned as it is not mentioned in either his biography by Jim Haskins or the biography of James Europe.

Coast Artillery
After World War I, the regiment was spread out throughout New York and still maintained some military exercises. In 1924, they were reorganized as the 369th Coast Artillery (Antiaircraft) Regiment. They were then deployed to Hawaii and parts of the West Coast.
Constituted in the New York National Guard as 369th Coast Artillery (AA) (United States Army Coast Artillery Corps) on 11 October 1921 as follows:
Headquarters and Headquarters Battery from Headquarters and Headquarters Battery 369th Infantry Regiment
1st Battalion from 1st Battalion 369th Infantry
2nd Battalion from 2nd Battalion 369th infantry
Inducted into federal service 13 January 1941 at New York City

Regiment was broken up 12 December 1943 as Follows-
Headquarters and Headquarters Battery as 369th Antiaircraft Artillery Group (Colored) (disbanded November 1944)
1st battalion as 369th Antiaircraft Artillery Battalion (semi mobile) (Colored) (See 369th Sustainment Brigade (United States)).
2nd Battalion as 870th Antiaircraft Artillery Automatic Weapons Battalion (Colored). (see 970th Field Artillery Battalion.)

World War II

On 15 May 1942, the 369th Infantry Regiment was re-established as an element of the 93rd Infantry Division (Colored) in the Army of the United States; as a result, this iteration of the 369th Infantry does not have any lineal connection with the 15th New York established before World War I and that is still active in the present day. It was deployed overseas and participated in labor and security operations in the Southwest Pacific Area. The 369th, along with the rest of the 93rd Infantry Division, occupied Morotai in Dutch New Guinea from April to June 1945, seeing limited combat. The division redeployed to Zamboanga in the Philippines on 1 July 1945, where it conducted "mop up" patrols until the Japanese surrendered on 15 August. The 369th left the Philippines with the division on 17 January 1946, returning to the United States on 1 February. The unit was deactivated two days later.

Armory
In 1933, the 369th Regiment Armory was created to honor the 369th regiment for their service. This armory stands at 142nd and Fifth Avenue, in the heart of Harlem. This armory was constructed starting in the 1920s and was completed in the 1930s. The 369th Regiment Armory was listed on the National Register of Historic Places in 1994 and was designated as a city landmark by the New York City Landmarks Preservation Commission in 1985.

Later years
The infantry's polished post-World War I reputation was not completely safe from external criticism, which ultimately surfaced as a result of ongoing racial tension in the United States. In 1940, the Chicago Defender reported that the United States Department of War arranged for the 369th regiment to be renamed the "Colored Infantry." The department announced that there were too many infantry units in the national guard and the 369th regiment would be among those slated to go, the first alleged step toward abolishing the famed unit. Supporters of the regiment swiftly objected to the introduction of racial identity in the title of a unit in the United States army, effectively preserving the regiment's reputation. However, eventually, all African American US Army units were renamed as "Colored," and the 369th served in World War II as the 369th Coast Artillery Regiment (Antiaircraft) (Colored), with its successor being the 369th Infantry Regiment (Colored).

In 2003, the New York State Department of Transportation renamed the Harlem River Drive as the "Harlem Hellfighters Drive." On 29 September 2006 a twelve-foot high monument was unveiled to honor the 369th Regiment. This statue is a replica of a monument that stands in France. The monument is made of black granite and contains the 369th crest and rattlesnake insignia.

Descending units of the 369th Infantry Regiment have continued to serve since World War I. The 369th Infantry Regiment continued to serve up until World War II where they would be reorganized into the 369th Anti-aircraft Artillery Regiment. The newly formed regiment would serve in Hawaii and throughout much of the West Coast. Another 369th Infantry Regiment was raised in 1942 as part of the 93rd Infantry Division (Colored), but is not listed as a New York National Guard unit. At some time postwar, the 369th was re-formed into the present-day 369th Sustainment Brigade.

The Congressional Gold Medal was awarded to the regiment in August 2021 in recognition of their bravery and outstanding service during World War I.

Notable soldiers
Benjamin O. Davis Sr.
James Reese Europe
Hamilton Fish III
Susan Elizabeth Frazier
Harry Haywood
Henry Johnson
Otis Johnson
Rafael Hernández Marín
Horace Pippin
Spotswood Poles
Needham Roberts
George Seanor Robb
Noble Sissle
Vertner Woodson Tandy
John Woodruff
 George F. Shiels
 Charles Luckyth Robert
 William Hayward

Distinctive unit insignia
 Description

A silver color metal and enamel device  in height overall consisting of a blue shield charged with a silver rattlesnake coiled and ready to strike.
 Symbolism
The rattlesnake is a symbol used on some colonial flags and is associated with the thirteen original colonies. The silver rattlesnake on the blue shield was the distinctive regimental insignia of the 369th Infantry Regiment, ancestor of the unit, and alludes to the service of the organization during World War I.

 Background

The distinctive unit insignia was originally approved for the 369th Infantry Regiment on 17 April 1923. It was redesignated for the 369th Coast Artillery Regiment on 3 December 1940. It was redesignated for the 369th Antiaircraft Artillery Gun Battalion on 7 January 1944. It was redesignated for the 569th Field Artillery Battalion on 14 August 1956. The insignia was redesignated for the 369th Artillery Regiment on 4 April 1962. It was amended to correct the wording of the description on 2 September 1964. It was redesignated for the 569th Transportation Battalion and amended to add a motto on 13 March 1969. The insignia was redesignated for the 369th Transportation Battalion and amended to delete the motto on 14 January 1975. It was redesignated for the 369th Support Battalion and amended to revise the description and symbolism on 2 November 1994. The insignia was redesignated for the 369th Sustainment Brigade and amended to revise the description and symbolism on 20 July 2007.

369th Veterans' Association
The 369th Veterans' Association is a group created to honor those who served in the 369th infantry. This veterans group has three distinct goals. According to the Legal Information Institute of the Cornell Law Institute these include,"promoting the principles of friendship and goodwill among its members; engaging in social and civic activities that tend to enhance the welfare of its members and inculcate the true principles of good citizenship in its members; and memorializing, individually and collectively, the patriotic services of its members in the 369th antiaircraft artillery group and other units in the Armed Forces of the United States."

Depiction in media
Fictionalized accounts featuring the Harlem Hellfighters include the 2014 graphic novel The Harlem Hellfighters written by Max Brooks and illustrated by Caanan White. It depicts a fictionalized account of the 369th's tour in Europe during World War I.  a film adaptation of the aforementioned novel is in the works under Sony Pictures and Overbrook Entertainment.

In 2018 the 369th Infantry Regiment became part of the documentary Noble Sissle's Syncopated Ragtime, directed and produced by Daniel L. Bernardi and David de Rozas with the collaboration of El Dorado Films and the Veteran Documentary Corps. The film subject is musician and Harlem Hellfighters' soldier Noble Sissle, the documentary won Best US Documentary Feature Film at the 2019 American Documentary Film Festival and Film Fund.

Swedish power metal band Sabaton dedicated a song to the Harlem Hellfighters on their 2022 album The war to end all wars.

See also
 369th Sustainment Brigade (United States)

References

Sources

Further reading
 Barbeau, Arthur E., and Florette Henri. The Unknown Soldiers; Black American Troops in World War I. Philadelphia: Temple University Press, 1974. .
 Harris, Bill. The Hellfighters of Harlem: African-American Soldiers Who Fought for the Right to Fight for Their Country. New York: Carroll & Graf Publishers, 2002. , .
 Harris, Stephen L. Harlem's Hell Fighters: The African-American 369th Infantry in World War I. Washington, D.C.: Brassey's, Inc, 2003. , .
 Little, Arthur W. From Harlem to the Rhine: The Story of New York's Colored Volunteers. New York: Covici, Friede, Publishers, 1936. (Reprinted: New York: Haskell House, 1974. ).
 Myers, Walter Dean, and Bill Miles. The Harlem Hellfighters: When Pride Met Courage. New York: HarperCollins Publishers, 2006. , .
 Nelson, Peter. A More Unbending Battle: The Harlem Hellfighters' Struggle for Freedom in WWI and Equality at Home. New York: Basic Civitas, 2009. .
 Sammons, Jeffrey T., and John H. Morrow, Jr. Harlem's Rattlers and the Great War: The Undaunted 369th Regiment and the African American Quest for Equality. Lawrence, KS: University Press of Kansas, 2014. .
 Wright, Ben, "Victory and Defeat: World War I, the Harlem Hellfighters, and a Lost Battle for Civil Rights," Afro-Americans in New York Life and History, 38 (Jan. 2014) pp:35–70.

African Americans in World War I
 Scott, Emmett Jay. Scott's Official History of the American Negro in the World War. A Complete and Authentic Narration, from Official Sources, of the Participation of American Soldiers of the Negro Race in the World War for Democracy ... a Full Account of the War Work Organizations of Colored Men and Women and Other Civilian Activities, Including the Red Cross, the Y.M.C.A., the Y.W.C.A. and the War Camp Community Service, with Official Summary of Treaty of Peace and League of Nations Covenant. Chicago: Homewood Press, 1919. . (Reprinted: New York, Arno Press, 1969. .)
 Williams, Charles H. Sidelights on Negro Soldiers. Boston: B.J. Brimmer Co, 1923. . (Reprinted as: Negro Soldiers in World War I: The Human Side. New York: AMS Press, 1970. ).

Infantry regiments of the United States Army National Guard
Infantry regiments of the United States Army in World War II
United States Army regiments of World War I
Congressional Gold Medal recipients
African Americans in World War I
African Americans in World War II
African-American United States Army personnel